Flughafensee is a lake near Tegel Airport in the borough of Reinickendorf in Berlin, Germany. It was formed by gravel quarrying operations in the period after the second world war. After operations were shut down in 1978, it was gradually taken over by the local population as a recreational lake with beaches and an angling club. The lake is surrounded by woodland, part of the Jungfernheide area.

References

Lakes of Berlin
Reinickendorf